Danny Ansell (born ) is a Wales international rugby league footballer who last played for the Dewsbury Rams in the Betfred Championship.

Background
Ansell was born in Wakefield, West Yorkshire, England.

Playing career
Ansell played junior rugby league for the Stanley Rangers ARLFC before being signed by the Huddersfield Giants.

Ansell joined the Hunslet Hawks in 2012 from the Wakefield Trinity Wildcats.

He made his début for Wales in 2016, playing against Italy. He was named in Wales 2017 Rugby League World Cup squad.

His uncle, Barry Eaton, played in the 2000 Rugby League World Cup.

References

External links
(archived by web.archive.org) Swinton Lions profile
(archived by web.archive.org) Statistics at rlwc2017.com

1991 births
Living people
Dewsbury Rams players
English people of Welsh descent
English rugby league players
Hunslet R.L.F.C. players
Rugby league halfbacks
Rugby league players from Wakefield
Swinton Lions players
Wales national rugby league team players